El Carmen District is one of ten districts of the province Churcampa, in Peru.

Ethnic groups 
The people in the district are mainly Indigenous citizens of Quechua descent. Quechua is the language which the majority of the population (85.81%) learnt to speak in childhood, 13.77% of the residents started speaking using the Spanish language (2007 Peru Census).

References